The 2018 Canoe Marathon European Championships is the fifteenth edition of the Canoe Marathon European Championships, which took place between 5 and 8 July 2018 at Metković, Croatia. The competition consisted of seventeen events – ten in kayak and seven in canoe – divided into junior, under–23 and senior categories.

Medalists

Seniors

Under 23

Juniors

Medal table

References

External links
 

Canoe Marathon European Championships
Canoe Marathon European Championships
International sports competitions hosted by Croatia
Marathon European Championships
Canoeing in Croatia
July 2018 sports events in Europe
Sport in Metković